Lunulariidae is a family of bryozoans belonging to the order Cheilostomatida.

Genera:
 Lunularia Busk, 1884

References

Cheilostomatida